Bryan Thompson (born October 11, 1974 in Phoenix, Arizona) is an automotive and freelance designer. He received a Bachelor of Industrial Design degree from College for Creative Studies in 1999 and was employed at Nissan Design America in San Diego for a decade.  Thompson has created production and concept car designs for Nissan, Volvo / Mack Trucks, Embraer Executive Jets and Airstream. He currently lives in Los Angeles with his partner since 2011. He has designed in studious "around the world from France to Japan, Austria, and Brazil."

He has had a lifelong passion for designing, as a child he "took on decorating the family home." "Everything from our family Tercel 4WD to the Bang & Olufsen stereo my mom came home with on a whim in 1979 had a soul or presence in my mind because they "affected" the world they existed in. I thought that since those things illicit strong reactions in people, they were somehow alive. They certainly had a sentience in my mind.  I wanted to make friends with the stereo, the car, the phone, and then create more friends."

His mother knew he was gay at a very young age and embraced his uniqueness and allowed him to be creative. She allowed him to whimsically decorate the entire home when he was just five, "Giving me that freedom definitely ignited a spark and confidence that you can change the space you’re in, I’m very grateful she did that." When he was three he became enamored with a neighbor's Datsun Honey Bee and has been drawing car designs ever since. "It had tiny wheels, awkward styling and a giant decal of a Bee plastered on the side.  At three years old, I was in love." He says that's when he fell in love with old economy cars. In 2011 the New York Times wrote about his efforts to find a new home for his 1990 Nissan Pao, after the museum it was in closed.

His approach to design can be described as functional and whimsical. He was hired right out of college by Nissan and put directly into a production program. His first professional project was the Nissan Titan Truck and Armada interiors. He is proudest of his work on the Nissan NV2500 cargo van.

In the June 2006 issue of Architectural Digest, he was cited as initiating the relationship with Airstream by showing up "at the opening of the Airstream Diner on Los Angeles's Santa Monica Boulevard tricked out in a pair of silver trousers and bearing a gift."  The gift was a model of the trailer that would eventually become the production BaseCamp.

Thompson is openly gay and came in second on the 2014 reality television show "Motor City Masters" on TruTV. His prize was a 2016 Chevy Camaro Z28, which he had pledged prior to the show to start a scholarship for LGBT designers. He will auction of the car worth $80,000 and use the funds to start the Bryan Thompson Design Scholarship. Starting the scholarship was the reason he decided to do the show. He was skeptical about joining the production but producers convinced him the show would be inspirational showcasing contestants' creativity. Thompson and "Motor City Masters" winner Camillo Pardo had agreed before the finale to split the prize of $100,000 and the car with whoever came in second.

References

External links
Bryan Thompson Design website
TruTV website

1974 births
Living people
American industrial designers
Artists from Phoenix, Arizona
College for Creative Studies alumni